Pahou is a town and arrondissement in the Atlantique Department of southern Benin. It is an administrative division under the jurisdiction of the commune of Ouidah. According to the population census conducted by the Institut National de la Statistique Benin on February 15, 2002, the arrondissement had a total population of 14,436.

Transport 
In 2015 a suburban passenger railway line, call Blueline is being developed by Bénirail of the Bolloré Group.

The project includes complete replacement of the track and the rehabilitation of the stations at Cadjèhoun Saint-Jean, Godomey, Cococodji and Pahou.

Notable people 
 Calixte Dakpogan (1958-), sculptor

References

External links 

Populated places in the Atlantique Department
Arrondissements of Benin